World on Fire or Worlds on Fire may refer to:

Albums
World on Fire, a 2006 album by By the Tree
Your World on Fire, a 2009 album by In Fear and Faith
World's on Fire (album), a 2011 album by the Prodigy
World on Fire (Slash album), a 2014 album
World on Fire (Yngwie Malmsteen album), a 2016 album
Worlds on Fire (EP), a 2020 EP by Duncan Laurence

Songs
"World on Fire", a 1986 song by Swiss band Krokus from Change of Address
"World on Fire", a 2013 song by Swedish band The Royal Concept
"World on Fire" (Sarah McLachlan song) from the Canadian singer's 2003 album Afterglow
"World on Fire" (Firewind song), by Greek band Firewind
"World's on Fire" (song), by Gibraltarian band Breed 77
"World's on Fire", a 2018 song by Mike Shinoda from the album Post Traumatic
"Set My World on Fire", a song by British band The Feeling
"World on Fire", a song by The Bouncing Souls from the 2020 album Volume 2
"World on Fire", a song by Luna Halo from their 2007 self-titled album

Other uses
World on Fire (book), non-fiction book by Amy Chua
Doom 3: Worlds on Fire, novel by Matthew Costello
World on Fire (TV series), a British war drama series

See also
Set the World on Fire (disambiguation)